Sock-Cess is a 1989 compilation album by Red Hot Chili Peppers and was released exclusively in the UK by EMI as a promotional only release. The album contains tracks from the band's first four studio albums.

Track listing
 "Higher Ground" (Stevie Wonder) – 3:21
 From the 1989 album Mother's Milk
 "Taste the Pain" – 4:20
 From the 1989 album Mother's Milk
 "Knock Me Down" – 3:43
 From the 1989 album Mother's Milk
 "Subway to Venus" – 4:17
 From the 1989 album Mother's Milk
 "Sexy Mexican Maid" – 3:40
 From the 1989 album Mother's Milk
 "Fight Like a Brave" – 3:47
 From the 1987 album The Uplift Mofo Party Plan
 "Behind the Sun" – 4:45
 From the 1987 album The Uplift Mofo Party Plan
 "Backwoods" – 3:06
 From the 1987 album The Uplift Mofo Party Plan
 "Me & My Friends" – 3:05
 From the 1987 album The Uplift Mofo Party Plan
 "Special Secret Song Inside" – 3:15
 From the 1987 album The Uplift Mofo Party Plan
 "The Brothers Cup" – 3:24
 From the 1985 album Freaky Styley
 "American Ghost Dance" – 3:40
 From the 1985 album Freaky Styley
 "Hollywood (Africa)" – 4:58
 From the 1985 album Freaky Styley
 "If You Want Me to Stay" (Sly and the Family Stone) – 4:06
 From the 1985 album Freaky Styley
 "Freaky Styley" – 3:33
 From the 1985 album Freaky Styley
 "Get Up and Jump" – 2:50
 From the 1984 album The Red Hot Chili Peppers
 "Mommy Where's Daddy" – 3:22
 From the 1984 album The Red Hot Chili Peppers
 "True Men Don't Kill Coyotes" – 3:36
 From the 1984 album The Red Hot Chili Peppers
 "Green Heaven – 3:54
 From the 1984 album The Red Hot Chili Peppers
 "Buckle Down" – 3:22
 From the 1984 album The Red Hot Chili Peppers

Personnel
Red Hot Chili Peppers
 Anthony Kiedis – lead vocals (all tracks)
 Hillel Slovak – guitar (tracks 6–15), backing vocals, sitar (track 7)
 John Frusciante – guitar (tracks 1–5), backing vocals, lead vocals (track 3)
 Jack Sherman – guitar (tracks 16–20), backing vocals (track 1)
 Flea – bass (all tracks), trumpet (tracks 2, 4), backing vocals
 Jack Irons – drums (tracks 6–10), backing vocals
 Cliff Martinez – drums (tracks 11–20)
 Chad Smith – drums (tracks 1, 3, 4, 5)

Additional musicians
 Dave Coleman – cello (track 2)
 Philip "Fish" Fisher – drums (track 2)
Gwen Dickey – backing vocals (track 17)

Production
 Norwood Fisher – producer
 Michael Beinhorn – producer (tracks 1–10)
 George Clinton – producer (tracks 11–15)
 Andy Gill – producer (tracks 16–20)

References

1989 compilation albums
1989 greatest hits albums
Red Hot Chili Peppers compilation albums
EMI Records compilation albums